Kimberly Ann Possible is a fictional character and the title protagonist of the animated Disney television series Kim Possible, voiced by actress Christy Carlson Romano. Created by Bob Schooley and Mark McCorkle, the character debuted in the pilot "Crush", which premiered on June 7, 2002. After starring in each of the show's 87 episodes, Kim made her final appearance in the hour-long series finale "Graduation", which originally aired on September 7, 2007. A high school cheerleader moonlighting as a teenage crime-fighter, the majority of Kim's missions involve her thwarting the plans of her archenemy Dr. Drakken, a mad scientist, all-the-while coping with everyday challenges commonly associated with adolescence.

Inspired by their own daughters, Schooley and McCorkle conceived Kim as a teenage girl capable of doing anything, basing the character on their own childhood hero James Bond. Upon noticing the relative lack of strong female leads in children's animated television, they decided to reverse traditional gender roles by making Kim the show's action hero accompanied by a male comedic sidekick in the form of best friend-turned-boyfriend Ron Stoppable. Devoid of both superpowers and a secret identity unlike traditional superheroes, the character's crime-fighting abilities are instead drawn from her cheerleading experience, thus making her more relatable to young viewers. Originally designed as a bombshell based on video game character Lara Croft, Kim's appearance was ultimately altered to resemble a teenage girl instead.

When Kim Possible premiered in 2002, Kim was instantly well-liked by both female and male audiences. The character has since been very positively received by critics, who hailed her as a positive role model for young women, while heavily comparing her to similar crime-fighting television heroines Buffy Summers from Buffy the Vampire Slayer and Sydney Bristow from Alias, both of whom preceded her. Kim has also earned the respect of feminist critics, who appreciated the character for both defying gender roles and challenging negative stereotypes associated with cheerleaders. A fashion trendsetter, the character's wardrobe is also believed to have helped popularize the wearing of crop tops and cargo pants during the early 2000s. The success of the show inspired the release of two television films, Kim Possible: A Sitch in Time (2003) and Kim Possible Movie: So the Drama (2005), as well as a video game series, in all of which Kim stars.

Role in Kim Possible
High school student Kim Possible (Christy Carlson Romano) fights crime alongside her best friend and eventual boyfriend and sidekick Ron Stoppable (Will Friedle), aided by his pet naked mole-rat Rufus (Nancy Cartwright) and computer genius Wade (Tahj Mowry). The character lives in fictional Middleton, USA with her parents James (Gary Cole) and Ann (Jean Smart), a rocket scientist and neurosurgeon respectively, and her younger brothers, identical twins Jim and Tim. Kim goes on extraordinary missions to save the world from danger at the hands of various supervillains and evil geniuses. Her most consistent adversaries are mad scientist Dr. Drakken and his sidekick Shego, the latter of whom is a former superheroine and skilled martial artist who has the ability to generate powerful energy blasts from her hands, and thus poses as her main combatant and threat.
 
Kim becomes a crime-fighter unintentionally. In need of a job, the character creates her own website, on which she promotes her own babysitting and lawn mowing services, using the slogan "I can do anything." When a wealthy entrepreneur accidentally contacts Kim Possible instead of Team Impossible when he becomes trapped by his own laser security system, Kim rushes to his aid, using her gymnastic abilities to disable the device. As news of Kim's heroism spreads and requests for her help increase, the character finally decides to pursue it as a career. Although hardly a normal teenager, Kim insists that she is just a "basic average girl" and must nonetheless cope with usual adolescent affairs, such as maintaining good grades in school, pleasing her parents, learning how to drive, dating and relationships, and attending cheerleading practice. Because Kim is too young to legally drive for most of the series, she relies on favors from friends – typically people she has rescued – for transportation.

Development

Conception and writing
Long-time writing partners Bob Schooley and Mark McCorkle said the idea for Kim Possible arrived from "out of the blue", when they realized there were few animated shows starring strong female characters in lead roles. Both McCorkle and Schooley had worked as writers on the male-led animated series Aladdin and Hercules for several years but longed to write "something original", and had just recently learned that young people were beginning to yearn for shows that depicted "ordinary kids in extraordinary circumstances." Thus, Schooley and McCorkle conceived Kim as a "girl who can do anything"; Kim Possible offered the writers a first-time opportunity to create an entirely new character "from scratch", which Schooley described as a "refreshing" experience in comparison to writing for characters who had already been long established.

Both Schooley's and McCorkle's own daughters inspired them to conceive Kim as "a character that our daughters and other girls can look up to", all-the-while aware of the "ancient truism" that while girls seldom hesitate to watch a show about a male lead, boys are usually less willing to do the opposite. Thus, the writers decided to reverse traditional gender roles by making Kim the show's competent action hero and Ron her "fumbling" sidekick, longing to provide young girls with "a character that they can pretend to be" similar to their own childhood heroes, fictional spy James Bond and Captain Kirk from Star Trek. According to McCorkle, Kim has much more in common with James Bond than comic book superheroes. The recurring character Monique was created because Schooley and McCorkle felt that it would be more realistic if Kim had a female best friend in addition to Ron. 

After three years, production on Kim Possible had virtually ceased following the premiere of the film So the Drama because the writers felt that finally establishing Kim and Ron as a couple would serve as "great wrap-up to the series", and thus had long abandoned creating new "outlets" for the character during the show's third season. Schooley and McCorkle had always wanted Kim and Ron to eventually end up a couple, but avoided this storyline for as long as possible in fear of "paint[ing] [themselves] into a corner". When the show was surprisingly renewed for a fourth season by popular demand, Schooley and McCorkle realized that pursuing Kim and Ron's relationship provided the series with "new story ideas" and "opportunities for comedy", and ultimately learned to appreciate the characters' "new dynamic." To prevent Kim and Ron's relationship from becoming "soap-opera-ish", the writers strove to maintain the basics of their friendship, with Kim continuing to save the world with Ron as her sidekick. In terms of character development, the show's main titles were finally adjusted to reflect the grade in which Kim is currently enrolled, changing it from high school sophomore to high school senior. Additionally, Kim finally gets her own car, which she inherits from her father, while her younger brothers Jim and Tim begin enrollment at Middleton High School, having skipped several grades due to their genius-level intellect, much to Kim's chagrin. However, Kim eventually relents and insists that her brothers continue attending the same school as her, threatening to leave if they do.

McCorkle recalled an incident in which a fan of the show was very much surprised to learn that the writers were actually men upon meeting them; the fan had always just assumed that they were both young women because of the way in which they characterized Kim.

Design, personality and abilities

Aware of what does and does not work in television animation, Schooley and McCorkle knew that Kim needed to be a appealing character. Kim's appearance evolved dramatically over the course of three months. The character was originally designed to look like "a pretty standard-looking athletic blonde", which was gradually changed in favor of a more distinctive appearance. At one point, Kim's design was based on that of video game character Lara Croft from Tomb Raider. However, Disney Channel eventually determined that Lara was "not a very real character". Finally, the creators decided to give Kim a more realistic appearance akin to that of a 14-year-old girl as opposed to a bombshell, concluding, "She has a nice, very appealing design, but we just wanted to keep it out of that realm of video game heroine." The creators admitted that Kim would have been their "dream girl" in high school, joking, "She would have been way out of our class though." Director Chris Baily wanted Kim to be designed with "graphic sensibilities" similar to those of the show's backgrounds, creating a 3D character "whose feet can be planted on the ground and communicate a sense of space." For example, when the character is dressed in all-black, Kim was drawn without a white outline so that she virtually disappears when she moves in front of a black background, yet her "simple design" and flesh allows audiences to "fill in where her body is" naturally. The show's female characters are the only characters drawn with lips, only the upper of which is visible. Describing Kim as "a mostly graphic heroine", Animation: A World History: Volume III: Contemporary Times author Giannalberto Bendazzi agreed that the character's "limited animation" was intentional. In the fourth season, the character's signature midriff baring crop top and cargo pants are replaced by a T-shirt and pants because the former outfit was damaged during a fight with Shego. Some viewers noted that Kim's face appeared to be "rounder" than it had been drawn in previous seasons. Kim was animated by Rough Draft Korea.

The creators wanted to make Kim as believable as possible. Schooley's and McCorkle's own daughters inspired them to conceive Kim as a "character with dimension ... that girls could watch and appreciate." McCorkle was quick in deciding very early on that Kim does not belong to a spy organization, nor does she possess any superpowers. Although admitting that the character's accomplishments are generally "implausible," Schooley and McCorkle wanted Kim to remain relatable to young viewers, and avoided making her "impervious" like superheroes by giving her "real problems and teen issues." McCorkle described Kim as "incredibly competent in the action world but challenged in the real world by all the things we all have trouble with", including embarrassment, school work and family. Schooley explained that "What makes Kim effective in the action world is gymnastics, cheerleading, physical activity, something that any kid, any girl, in the world could do." Additionally, the character is skilled in 17 different types of kung fu. At one point an indestructible supersuit complete with special abilities was created for Kim, but the outfit was ultimately abandoned to avoid contradicting with the character's "she can do anything" motto. Elaborating on her role in the pilot, Schooley believes that "Kim's mix of tenacity, intelligence and heart makes for a very strong female role model for kids," however, "Sure she can save the world, but that doesn't help her a bit when she comes face-to-face with her latest school crush." Furthermore, the writers envisioned the character having her own website and hand-held communicator – named the "Kimmunicator" after the character – with video chat, both of which were considered revolutionary back in 2000, a time when few young people owned cellphones. Kim's use of advanced technology represents her ability to "effortlessly hop around the world and get back in time for dinner. Which is pretty unrealistic, but it's what kids can do on the internet now. They can talk to somebody anywhere".

Kim's main goal in the series is simply to help those in need regardless of money or rewards, which Schooley and McCorkle deliberately instilled in the character's personality. One of her trademark gags involves her thanking people for providing her with transportation, to which they respond "No, thank you, for saving us". Although primarily writers, Schooley and McCorkle remained thoroughly involved in determining the overall appearance of the series, as well as the design of its characters. However, they accredit the majority of the series' aesthetics to season one director Chris Baily and artistic director Alan Bodner. Cartoonist Stephen Silver served as a character animator on the show.

Voice
Kim is voiced by American actress Christy Carlson Romano, who was only 16 years old when she was first cast as the character. The titular role was originally offered to actress Anneliese van der Pol, who turned it down in favor of co-starring as Chelsea Daniels in the Disney Channel Original Series That's so Raven. Before being cast as Kim, Romano had already been well known for starring as Ren Stevens in the Disney Channel sitcom Even Stevens. The actress was finally introduced to the show's creators by Disney Channel executives after Schooley and McCorkle had already auditioned several people for the role. According to McCorkle, Romano "nailed" her audition, which he described as "just fantastic." Kim was Romano's first voice-acting role. Upon being cast as Kim, Romano immediately identified with the character because they were "both dealing with teenage issues" at the time. During the show's first season, Romano and the rest of the Kim Possible cast recorded at different locations. Like her character, Romano also balanced her acting profession with schoolwork, and agreed that they are both confident in their endeavors. Because the actress was enrolled in high school in New York City at the time, she was often required to participate in cast meetings and table reads via telephone; Romano was actually unable to attend her own senior prom because she was working on Kim Possible. Occasionally, the actress herself would serve as creative inspiration for the writers; one episode in particular, "Blush", was based on the fact that Romano is a shy and easily embarrassed person who tends to "blush at even the slightest compliment/awkward situation." The writers also gave Kim several interests that are similar to Romano's own. Schooley enthused that the actress "add[s] something to [her character] that makes it more than a typical gag-oriented cartoon", crediting both her and co-star Will Friedle, voice of Ron, among reasons fans connected with the characters.

Romano described Kim as a "very ambitious, very skilled, very smart" character, and attempted to make her as much of a role model as possible. The actress also described the character as "a really confident, sweet girl who everybody loves. And she is a heroine who little girls look up to. ... She is a typical role model, perfect in every way. How could you not like Kim?" Romano initially doubted that the show would be successful, but eventually admitted that "the animation was great and the writing was amazing. It's done so that kids and adults can enjoy it; families can share an amazing experience together." Additionally, Romano's character greatly influenced her own career, and considers Kim to be a positive role model for young girls. Romano identified the season one episode "Mind Games" in which Kim and Ron switch bodies as her favorite. By the end of the series, Romano was 21 years old and attending Columbia University for political science. Kim's final recorded line in the series is "uuhhh...huh?", which Romano recorded tearfully due to the series ending.

Describing Kim as independent and athletic, Romano attributes her character's timelessness to her authenticity and genuineness, explaining that she "forged a path and now there are female shows everywhere".

Characterization and themes
The character's name "Kim Possible" is a portmanteau of the word "impossible". Although she is referred to by several nicknames throughout the series, Kim forgoes a secret identity entirely, and is known as simply "Kim Possible" to "everyone who knows her [and] knows what she does". Kadeen Griffiths of Bustle observed that, instead of a secret identify, Kim maintains "her own website where people could book her for jobs with a tagline that promised that she could do anything", a claim corroborated by the fact that she fights crime while performing well in class and remaining her school's cheerleading captain. Writing for Women Write About Comics, Jamie Kingston observed that Middleton High School "ignores her as a heroine unless something happens on school grounds where she has to do her thing". As such, Kim's work rarely receives attention from her immediate family and peers, although her clients remain grateful. According to Metacritic, Kim is stubborn and strong-willed with "a fuse shorter than a grenade", but remains "extremely humble, refusing to take credit for her truly amazing actions". Meanwhile, David Horiuchi of Amazon.com described the character as "tough, witty, and refreshingly free of any saucy teen attitude".

UGO described Kim as a "cheery and upbeat" character who "settles for nothing less than excellence". Despite her high school popularity, Kim is neither stuck-up nor superficial, and remains fiercely devoted to her schoolwork. The character's intellect counters negative stereotypes associated with cheerleading, often incorporating cheerleading routines into battle, whereas her rival and "polar opposite" Bonnie Rockwaller is depicted as "a typical cheerleader". Described by Tracey McLoone of PopMatters as "clever, as well as graceful and physically fit", the character also disproves the belief that brawn is superior to brains in battle. Nonetheless, Kim exhibits personality traits and interests typically associated with teenage girls, such as shopping, boy bands, fangirling over popular trends, describing herself as "basic average girl". Cinema Blend's Emily Marek said Kim's feminine interests "didn’t take away from the fact that she was saving the world on a weekly basis". Her best female friend Monique represents "Kim's bridge between the world of super-spy, superhero action, and the world of high school, and stuff teen girls care about". Despite her confidence as a young woman, Kim remains very much concerned about her love life, which is sometimes treated as one of her weaknesses. Although she excels at fighting, she struggles with real-world issues such as school. Mike McDaniel of the Houston Chronicle joked that "Nothing's impossible with Kim Possible -- except maybe landing a date." Much of the character's dialogue consists of "not-so-typical teen slang" including "So not the drama" and "No big", as well as her signature catchphrase "What's the sitch?".

Kim's unconventional relationship with her inept, unpopular best friend Ron ultimately uncovers the best in both characters. Ron helps balance some of Kim's negative qualities that could otherwise come off as unflattering. Their relationship heavily explores the friend zone, since Kim and Ron remain platonic friends for the majority of the series, although their romantic interests in each other is hinted at throughout. Kim has been jealous of Ron's girlfriends at times, while Ron fears confessing his love for her would jeopardize their friendship. Sarah Freymiller of Bustle described Ron as "the Joker to [Kim's] Batman; he is the intelligent, kind chaos in her highly-organized life". Meanwhile, Priya Krishna of BuzzFeed News observed, " At the end of the day, Kim needs Ron, and Ron is always there for her and never feels emasculated by the fact his friend/girlfriend is clearly better than him at everything".

Kim was among several fictional characters who debuted towards the end of the girl power and third-wave feminism eras. As an animated series, Kim Possible employed a diverse cast of strong female characters, namely Kim and Shego. Many of the character's typically feminine belongings double as powerful weapons and tools, namely her lip gloss and compact mirror. In his book Dangerous Curves: Action Heroines, Gender, Fetishism, and Popular Culture, author Jeffrey A. Brown believes that "Kim may be the epitome of a Girl Power-derived heroine". Like Kim herself, her grandmother Nana Possible also fought crime when she was young, from whom Kim is believed to have inherited her abilities. Kim's entire family is very intelligent, therefore the character is spared "the burden of being the only brain on the show". The character's relationship with her parents is atypically healthy for a teenager. Kim's father James "views women as equals", and thus has a good relationship with Kim although he struggles to come to terms with the reality that she is growing up and dating. Her mother Ann is essentially a "grown up" version of Kim, whose work as a brain surgeon Kim also admits to being impressed by. The Artifice observed that Kim and Shego are strikingly similar in appearance. Metacritc believes that Shego is essentially "Kim's dark reflection"; both characters are smart, athletic and attractive with green eyes, but Shego chooses to use her powers for evil instead. Despite their bitter rivalry, Kim and Shego have mutual respect for each other to the point of which they occasionally work together when the situation demands it. According to Metacritic, Kim's "fiery" red hair symbolizes "her attitude that is best summed up by the phrase, 'I can do anything.'" The character is infamous for her puppy dog pout, which she often uses to get her way.

Appearances

Kim Possible was very successful, running for a total of five years from June 7, 2002, to September 7, 2007, and spanning four seasons, becoming the longest-running Disney Channel Original Series until eventually being surpassed by Phineas and Ferb. The series comprised 84 episodes, with Kim starring in each one. Kim also made an appearance in the Lilo & Stitch: The Series crossover episode "Rufus".

A stop-motion version of Kim appeared in an episode of Robot Chicken where she is trapped by Kim Jong-un while trying to stop North Korean nuclear launch codes, and they both mock their names by making puns out of them. She is voiced by Rachael MacFarlane in the episode. Also, the title name in the skit is called "Mission Kim Possible", a parody and allusion of Kim Possible and Mission: Impossible, a successful action spy movie franchise that served as a follow up to the 1966 and 1988 TV shows.

Sadie Stanley portrayed Kim Possible in Disney Channel's live action adaptation television film of the animated series, aired on February 15, 2019.

Kim, Ron and Rufus have had non-speaking cameos in the Chibiverse cartoon series in 2022.

Epcot theme park attraction
In 2009, a theme park attraction entitled the Kim Possible World Showcase Adventure premiered at Walt Disney World's Epcot. Upon arrival, visitors were allowed to partake in an alternate reality game (ARG) inspired by the television series in which they entered into the world of Kim Possible and ventured on a "high-tech scavenger hunt" in a simulated country of their choice. The attraction closed down in 2012 and was replaced by Agent P's World Showcase Adventure, another scavenger hunt-like attraction inspired by the Phineas and Ferb series.

Reception and legacy
Response towards Kim has been very positive, with critics commonly praising her as a positive role model to whom young viewers can relate. Jacqueline Cutler of the Sun-Sentinel hailed the character as "as close to a role model as an animated cheerleader trying to save the world can be". Rob Owen of the Pittsburgh Post-Gazette joked that, despite dressing like singer Britney Spears, Kim shares "the same insecurities as all adolescents". Tracey McLoone of PopMatters believes the show's "merit lies primarily in [its] heroine", while Levi Buchanan of IGN found the character to be "well-fleshed out". The Sunday Mail's Shuhaidah Saharani touted Kim Possible "Disney Channel's favourite femme fatale". Reviewing Kim Possible: So the Drama, the film originally intended to end the series, Amazon.com's David Horiuchi cited the character among the main reasons why the show will be missed. Several reviewers, such as Betsy Wallace of Common Sense Media, also compared Kim to television action heroines who preceded her, namely Buffy Summers from Buffy the Vampire Slayer and Sydney Bristow from Alias, as well as the titular Powerpuff Girls. Horiuchi described Kim as "An Alias-type heroine for the tween-age set" whose "school-girl awkwardness can prove appealing to grown-up kids as well", whereas McLoone appreciated that Kim is seemingly more confident than her contemporaries. Likening Kim to comic book superheroine Wonder Woman, Kathryn Shattuck of The New York Times wrote that Kim is prepared to defend humankind "without sacrificing her interest in boys and clothes", observing that she does not rely on costumes "or a jolt of testosterone to get the job done". The Huffington Post's Carly Steyer credited Kim with teaching the importance of maintaining a healthy work–life balance, writing, "She paid an appropriate amount of attention to her schoolwork, and worked hard, but didn't slave over it to the extent that she didn't have any time left to save the world". In a 2019 retrospective, Variety's Mekeisha Madden Toby wrote that the series "connected with its audience because it portrayed a strong but fashion-forward young woman who fought crime and got good grades". Paste's Alexis Gunderson crowned Kim the year 2000's "favorite red-headed teen action heroine". 

The character has also been well-received by feminist critics, some of whom consider her to be a feminist icon. Writing for the feminist website Refinery29, Claire Fahey described Kim as "a feminist icon for the millennial generation". Courtney Thompson of Body+Soul claimed Kim was "many women’s first feminist role model before we even recognised ourselves, or her, as feminist". Believing there to have been few female-lead action cartoons prior to Kim Possible, Thompson credited the character with "introduc[ing] a new form of girl power we hadn’t seen before". According to Odyssey contributor Veronica Faison, Kim "planted my early feminist roots, and perhaps even set my social justice path". Calling her a "cartoon idol", Kadeen Griffiths of Bustle lauded Kim as an "amazingly feminist" character who "taught girls that it was okay to overachieve" and "worrying about boys didn't make you any less of a hero". Both BuzzFeed's Ellie Bate and Bustle's Sarah Freymiller applauded Kim for combating outdated, sexist stereotypes about cheerleaders, while Pride ranked her among "13 Cartoon Characters Who Defied Gender Stereotypes". Rebecca C. Hains of Salem State College cited Kim among several "strong powerful girl [television] heroes" responsible for "breaking the mold" during the early 2000s. Stephanie Janssen of The Spectator recalled that "Seeing on the TV that Kim can do anything made me feel like I could do anything, too". Esmeer Rigden-Briscall of Her Campus credited Kim with teaching several valuable feminist lessons, describing her as simultaneously "the most underrated but most needed Kim around". However, Girlfighting: Betrayal and Rejection author Lyn Mikel Brown dismissed Kim as both a feminist and role model because of her perceived reliance on Ron's intelligence, as well as the observation that "Her biggest threat is not evil, in fact, but the head cheerleader".

Since her debut, Kim has been a popular character among both female and male fans of the show. At one point, fans of the character had sent her over one million e-mails via her website. MTV's Deepa Lakshmin predicted that Kim "will live on in our hearts forever". UGO ranked Kim 59th on the website's list of the 75 "hottest" animated characters, crowning her the "Disney Channel queen". Kim is also regarded as a fashion trendsetter, with Charmaine Simmons of Bustle crediting the character with popularizing crop tops, cargo pants and bodysuits. Also writing for Bustle, Sarah Freymiller called it "refreshing to see a girl decked out in functional black and army green attire" for much of the series. Fahey said Kim "rocked the hell out of her signature black crop top and loose cargo pants way before they were ever in style". Upon Apple's release of the Apple Watch, several critics drew similarities between the real-life device and the Kimmunicator.

References

Kim Possible characters
Animated human characters
Television characters introduced in 2002
Animated characters introduced in 2002
Fictional cheerleaders
Fictional gymnasts
Fictional female martial artists
Fictional American secret agents
Fictional high school students
Fictional vigilantes
Fictional wushu practitioners
Female characters in animated series
Martial artist characters in television
Teenage characters in television
Teenage superheroes
Crossover characters in television
Fictional female secret agents and spies
Fictional women soldiers and warriors